Blessed Paul may refer to:
 Paul Nzioki Mulwa
 Paul of Sandomierz
 Paul Joseph Nardini
 Paolo Manna
 Pavel Djidjov
 Pavel Peter Gojdič
 Pope Paul VI